Brechmoidion is a genus of beetles in the family Cerambycidae, containing the following species:

 Brechmoidion exicisifrons (Martins, 1960)
 Brechmoidion falcatum Napp & Martins, 1985
 Brechmoidion separatum Martins & Galileo, 2007

References

Ibidionini